Bab al-Faradis ("The Gate of the Paradise")  or Bab al-Amara is one of the seven ancient city-gates of Damascus, Syria.  The other name, Bab Al-Amara, refers to a name of a district in the old city where people in the 14th century would meet. During the Roman era, the gate was dedicated to Mercury.

References

External links
 Old Damascus Gates

Gates of Damascus